In scholastic philosophy, Actus Purus (English: "Pure Actuality," "Pure Act") is the absolute perfection of God.

Overview
Created beings have potentiality that is not actuality, imperfections as well as perfection. Only God is simultaneously all that He can be, infinitely real and infinitely perfect: 'I am who I am' (Exodus ). His attributes or His operations are really identical with His essence, and His essence necessitates His existence. (Contrast this understanding with the Essence–Energies distinction in Eastern Christian, particularly Palamite, theology).

In created beings, the state of potentiality precedes that of actuality; before being realized, a perfection must be capable of realization. But, absolutely speaking, actuality precedes potentiality. For in order to change, a thing must be acted upon, or actualized; change and potentiality presuppose, therefore, a being which is in actu. This actuality, if mixed with potentiality, presupposes another actuality, and so on, until we reach the actus purus.

According to Thomas Aquinas, a thing which requires completion by another is said to be in potency to that other: realization of potency is called actuality. The universe is conceived of as a series of things arranged in an ascending order, or potency and act at once crowned and created by God, who alone is Pure Act. God is changeless because change means passage from potency to act, and so He is without beginning and end, since these demand change. Matter and form are necessary to the understanding of change, for change requires the union of that which becomes and that which it becomes. Matter is the first, and form the second. All physical things are composed of matter and form. The difference between a thing as form or character and the actual existence of it is denoted by the terms essence and being (or existence). It is only in God that there is no distinction between the two. Both pairs – matter and form, essence and being – are special cases of potency and act. They are also modes: modes do not add anything to the idea of being, but are ways of making explicit what is implicit in it.

See also
Actual idealism
Actus essendi
Hyperuranion
Thomism
Avicennism

References

Scholasticism